Henry Weston (1534–1592) was a sixteenth century MP: firstly for Petersfield; then Surrey; and finally Petersfield again.

A son of Sir Francis Weston, who was executed for an alleged dalliance with Anne Boleyn,  he resided at Sutton Place in Surrey.

References

1534 births
1592 deaths
People from Surrey
English MPs 1571